Richard Lauffen (June 2, 1907 – August 28, 1990) was a German actor.

Filmography

References

External links
 

1907 births
1990 deaths
German male film actors
People from Mönchengladbach
20th-century German male actors